Thurm is a surname. Notable people with the surname include:

Fritz Thurm (1883–1937), German politician and resistance fighter
Kevin Thurm (born 1961), American politician, lawyer, and former government official
Marian Thurm (born 1952), American author of short stories and novels

See also
Thurm., taxonomic author abbreviation of Jules Thurmann (1804–1855), Alsatian French-Swiss geologist and botanist